Viktor Thor William Jensen (born 30 December 1987) is an Icelandic racing driver, with dual (British) nationality. His father is Canadian-born British radio DJ David Jensen.

Viktor read mechanical engineering at Imperial College London and is currently living in Hong Kong.

Career

Karting
Viktor debuted in kart racing at 11 years old, winning his first novice race. Over the next five years he quickly progressed through the ranks, culminating in competing at the CIK-FIA European ICA finals. Due to dual Icelandic/British nationality, he represented England in 2001 and 2002 at the Fathom Internations Challenge, himself winning the race in 2001.

Formula racing
In 2003, Viktor started to delve into the world of single-seater racing cars, attending the Formula BMW scholarship course in Valencia, Spain. Whetting his appetite to progress into cars, Viktor then tested a number of cars including Formula Ford, Formula Renault and Caterham Superlights. One of the cars tested was a Formula Palmer-Audi car. The FPA car impressed, and it was decided that 2004 would see Viktor competing in the Formula Palmer-Audi Championship.

In 2007 Viktor raced in the British Formula Three International Championship with the Alan Docking Racing team and in 2008 raced in the same series for the Nexa team.

References

External links
 Official Website – www.viktorjensen.co.uk

1987 births
Living people
English racing drivers
Icelandic racing drivers
British Formula Three Championship drivers
People from Hammersmith
Formula Palmer Audi drivers
English people of Danish descent
English people of Canadian descent
English people of Icelandic descent
Icelandic people of Danish descent
English emigrants to Iceland
Alumni of Imperial College London
Fluid Motorsport Development drivers
Alan Docking Racing drivers